North Fork Animas River is a tributary of the Animas River in San Juan County, Colorado. It flows south to a confluence with the West Fork Animas River that forms the Animas River.

See also
List of rivers of Colorado

References

Rivers of Colorado
Rivers of San Juan County, Colorado
Tributaries of the Colorado River in Colorado